Penicillium smithii is a species of fungus in the genus Penicillium which produces citreoviridin and canescin Penicillium smithii occurs in soil in Canada and Europe

References

Further reading 
 

smithii
Fungi described in 1982